The ARRIVE guidelines are a set of guidelines for improving experimental design and reporting standards for animal research, drawn up by the National Centre for the Replacement, Refinement and Reduction of Animals in Research.

References

External links 
 

Animal testing
Bioethics